Nettle tree or tree nettle can refer to:

 Celtis

Those names or stinging-nettle tree can also refer to the following plants with stinging hairs:
 Various species of the genus Dendrocnide
 Various species of the genus Obetia
 Urera baccifera
 Urtica ferox

Libythea celtis, the Nettle tree butterfly